Trans-Canada Air Lines Flight 810-9 was a Canadair North Star on a scheduled flight from Vancouver to Calgary (continuing to Regina, Winnipeg, and Toronto).  The plane crashed into Mount Slesse near Chilliwack, British Columbia, Canada, on 9 December 1956 after encountering severe icing and turbulence over the mountains.  All 62 people on board died, making it one of the deadliest airline crashes ever as of that date; it still ranks as the sixth deadliest air disaster in Canadian history.

Due to the remoteness and difficulty of the terrain, the crash site was not located until the following May, when it was discovered by mountaineers Elfrida Pigou, Geoffrey Walker, and David Cathcart. Among the victims were five professional Canadian football players on their way home from the annual Shrine Game between the East and West all-stars in Vancouver.

The remains are located in a highly inaccessible area and are protected from disturbance.

Summary of events 
Flight 810-9 left Vancouver International Airport at 6:10 PM on 9 December 1956, assigned to fly the Green 1 air lane east to Calgary, Alberta, though the pilots asked for and received clearance for a routing via airways Red 44 and Red 75 instead, which took the aircraft past Cultus Lake and into a weather system called a trowal.

This was the last communication received from the plane. The plane was also being tracked by an American radar installation in Birch Bay, Washington, throughout most of its flight after turning around, but at 7:11 pm the station lost track of Flt. 810 in the vicinity of  Mt. Silvertip just east-northeast of where the plane went down moments later.

The cause of the crash is given in the official report as being the combination of several factors with the main ones being icing of the wings and fuselage and the loss of No. 2 engine, but many questions remain, including why the aircraft turned away from Green 1 rather than toward it (reporting to ATC that it was on Green 1), and why this was picked up by neither the pilot nor First Officer despite spirit compasses and several radio aids-to-navigation on board which should have made the error rather obvious.

As the aircraft flew straight into the third peak of Mt. Slesse well in excess of cruising speed – and crashed in remote and dangerously inhospitable territory – very little information could be gleaned from the wreckage itself as to the cause of what was then the worst aircraft calamity in Canadian history.  The wreckage and remains of the passengers and crew were left on the mountain at the crash site (though body parts found during the Coroner's inquiry were interred in two common graves on the mountainside), and despite years of erosion and avalanche, remains of the aircraft can be seen to this day.

Victims 
 All three crew and 59 passengers were killed; among the victims were five professional Canadian football players on their way home from the annual East–West all-star game in Vancouver.

Notable passengers
Melvin Becket, a player with the Saskatchewan Roughriders
Mario DeMarco, former National Football League player, a player with the Saskatchewan Roughriders
Calvin Jones, a player with Winnipeg Blue Bombers
Gordon Sturtridge, a player with the Saskatchewan Roughriders
Ray Syrnyk, a player with the Saskatchewan Roughriders

See also
Aviation safety
Controlled flight into terrain
Ground proximity warning system
 List of accidents involving sports teams

Notes

References
O'Keefe, Betty and MacDonald, Ian, Disaster on Mount Slesse, Caitlin Press, 2006, 

Pitts, Major General Herb C., "In Peace Prepared", Chapter 80, Published by the Regimental Trust, The Queen's Own Rifles of Canada, 2014, 

810
Aviation accidents and incidents in 1956
Airliner accidents and incidents in Canada
Aviation accidents and incidents involving controlled flight into terrain
1956 in Canada
Accidents and incidents involving the Canadair North Star
Disasters in British Columbia
December 1956 events in Canada